Salvatore Pappalardo (1817–1884) was an Italian composer and conductor.

Born in Catania, Pappalardo began his studies in his home city before entering the Palermo Conservatory where he studied under Pietro Raimondi. He worked as a music teacher and was a  conductor at the opera house in Catania until he moved to Naples in 1845 when he was made the court composer for Prince Leopold, Count of Syracuse. He later worked as a teacher of music theory and composition in Naples. He died in Naples in 1884.

Pappalardo's work as a composer was mainly directed towards composing operas and other music for the theatre. He composed eight operas: Francesca da Rimini (1844), Il corsaro (Naples, 1846), La figlia del Doge (Catania, 1855), L'atrabiliare (Naples, 1856), Mirinda (Naples, 1860), Gustavo Wasa (Naples, 1865), Le diavolesse (Naples, 1878), and Le due ambasciatrici (never performed). He also composed a significant amount of church music. His most successful and innovative music however, was his chamber music; particularly his collection of art songs for voice and piano and a collection of string quartets and quintets. His chamber music was played throughout Italy and Germany.

References
N. Giannotta. Secoli di musica catanese (Catania, 1968)

External links

1817 births
1884 deaths
Italian classical composers
Italian male classical composers
Italian opera composers
Male opera composers
19th-century classical composers
19th-century Italian composers
Italian conductors (music)
Italian male conductors (music)
19th-century conductors (music)
Musicians from Catania